Nandaprayag Legislative Assembly constituency was one of the seventy electoral Uttarakhand Legislative Assembly constituencies of Uttarakhand state in India.
 It was a part of Garhwal (Lok Sabha constituency) and was abolished in 2012 following the delimitation.

Members of Legislative Assembly

References

Former assembly constituencies of Uttarakhand
2002 establishments in Uttarakhand
Constituencies established in 2002